The 2022 Auburn Tigers baseball team represented Auburn University in the 2022 NCAA Division I baseball season. The Tigers played their home games at Plainsman Park.

Previous season

The Tigers finished 25–27, 10–20 in the SEC to finish in sixth place in the West division. They were not invited to the postseason.

Schedule and results

Standings

Results

See also
2022 Auburn Tigers softball team

References

Auburn
Auburn Tigers baseball seasons
Auburn Tigers baseball
Auburn
College World Series seasons